In mathematics, the Mehler–Heine formula introduced by Gustav Ferdinand Mehler and Eduard Heine describes the asymptotic behavior of the Legendre polynomials  as the index tends to infinity, near the edges of the support of the weight. There are generalizations to other classical orthogonal polynomials, which are also called the Mehler–Heine formula. The formula complements the Darboux formulae which describe the asymptotics in the interior and outside the support.

Legendre polynomials

The simplest case of the Mehler–Heine formula states that

where  is the Legendre polynomial of order , and  the Bessel function of order 0.

Jacobi polynomials

The generalization to Jacobi polynomials  is given by Gábor Szegő as follows

where  is the Bessel function of order .

Laguerre polynomials

Using generalized Laguerre polynomials and confluent hypergeometric functions, they can be written as

where  is the Laguerre function.

Hermite polynomials

Using the expressions equivalating Hermite polynomials and Laguerre polynomials where two equations exist, they can be written as

where  is the Hermite function.

References

Orthogonal polynomials